Elisabetta Pizio (born 19 March 1971) is an Italian speed skater. She competed in two events at the 1994 Winter Olympics.

References

External links
 

1971 births
Living people
Italian female speed skaters
Olympic speed skaters of Italy
Speed skaters at the 1994 Winter Olympics
People from Schilpario
Sportspeople from the Province of Bergamo